Batmönkhiin Bolor-Erdene (born 12 November 2002) is a Mongolian table tennis player. She competed in the 2020 Summer Olympics.

References

External links
 

2002 births
Living people
Sportspeople from Ulaanbaatar
Table tennis players at the 2020 Summer Olympics
Mongolian table tennis players
Olympic table tennis players of Mongolia
Asian Games competitors for Mongolia
Table tennis players at the 2018 Asian Games